The Save Romania Union (USR) is a liberal political party active in Romania and Moldova, currently the third largest party in the Parliament of Romania with 42 deputies and 22 senators, and fifth at national level (following the 2020 Romanian local elections), after the Democratic Alliance of Hungarians in Romania (UDMR/RMDSZ) and the People's Movement Party (PMP), two smaller centre-right political parties in the country. 

The party was founded following the success of the Save Bucharest Union (USB) party in the 2016 local elections. After being officially registered as a political party in 2016, it united with the local USB and Union for Codlea parties, thus gaining most of its initial membership base from the two latter parties.

Between 2016 and 2020, it was the third largest political party in the Romanian Parliament after the 2016 legislative elections and ran on an anti-corruption platform. In 2019, it established a political alliance with the Freedom, Unity and Solidarity Party (PLUS) led by former technocratic Prime Minister Dacian Cioloș which it eventually absorbed in 2021. Dacian Cioloș, who was also subsequently elected president of the party but who resigned in the meantime from this position, left the USR with a group of followers (most notably several MEPs) in late May 2022 in order to form his own party called REPER.

Starting from December 2020 onwards, USR is still the third largest political party in the Romanian Parliament after the 2020 Romanian legislative elections, running once more on an even successful anti-corruption platform compared to the previous legislative elections from 2016.

History 

USR continued the political project Save Bucharest Union at the national level, established on 1 July 2015. At the Save Bucharest Union (USB) kick off conference talking about goals of the new movement, Nicușor Dan stated:

Besides Nicușor Dan, the founding members of the Save Bucharest Union were Ioan Miloș, Alina Vernon, Dan Podaru, and Argentina Traicu, the last two have retreated as founding members and from the Initiative Committee in January 2016.

On 23 February 2016, Nicușor Dan published on his Facebook account the document „Programul pentru București al candidatului Nicușor Dan (Uniunea Salvați Bucureștiul) la Primăria Generală” ("The Bucharest program of the candidate Nicușor Dan (Save Bucharest Union) at the General City Hall"), which he submitted to the public debate. In 2016, at the local elections held that year, the Save Bucharest Union had obtained a score of 25% in Bucharest and was ranked in second place according to Bucharest's preferences.

On 21 August 2016, Save Bucharest Union (USB) merged with the Union for Codlea and Save Romania Union, the new formation bearing the name Save Romania Union, and participated in the parliamentary elections held in 2016. During the merger congress, Nicușor Dan was elected the president of the party, the vice presidents became Cristian Ghica, Clotilde Armand, Dumitru Dobrev, Roxana Wring, and Erwin Albu. For the legislative elections, Nicușor Dan has predicted at least 10% of votes for the new formation. Officially, the merger process has been hampered by numerous appeals, filed by PSD, PER, and private individuals. By a decision of 29 December 2016 issued by the Bucharest Court of Appeal, the merger remained final.

At the congress held on 28 October 2017 in Poiana Brașov, Dan Barna was elected the new president of the party, for a two-year term.

The fifth National Congress of the USR was held in Timișoara on 14–15 September 2019. At this congress, the leader Dan Barna was reconfirmed as president of the party, at the same time being elected nine vice-presidents, as well as the new members of the National Bureau and the members of the National Commissions of Arbitration and Censors.

On 11 October 2021, Klaus Iohannis nominated USR leader and former technocratic Prime Minister Dacian Cioloș to form a new government. On 7 February 2022, Dacian Cioloș resigned as USR leader, after his agenda of internal party reforms was rejected by the party's National Bureau, with Cătălin Drulă becoming acting/ad interim president.

Currently, the party is in parliamentary first/official opposition towards the CNR grand coalition, formed by their former allies, the National Liberal Party (PNL) and the Democratic Alliance of Hungarians in Romania (UDMR/RMDSZ) along with their longtime opponents, the Social Democratic Party (PSD). USR is in continuous parliamentary opposition towards the CNR government since late 2021 onwards. 

On 31 May 2022, former technocratic Prime Minister and party president Dacian Cioloș left the USR with several MEPs who were previously elected on the lists of the party for the 2019 European Parliament election in Romania in order to establish a new party called Renewing Romania's European Project (or REPER for short). The party was established in opposition to the current acting/ad interim leadership of the USR led by Cătălin Drulă.

The National Bureau of USR decided on 11 June that the next party congress will be held in July (first round between 6 and 10 July, second round between 11 and 15 July, and the online congress for validating the election of the party president on the 16 July), thereby changing the initial date of the congress which was previously set at a particular point in October 2022. According to some sources, it has been recently reported that incumbent Brașov mayor Allen Colliban is willing to face Cătălin Drulă (who filled his candidacy for party leadership in late May 2022) for the leadership of the party at the forthcoming party congress. In the meantime, Octavian Berceanu has filled his candidacy for party leadership in late June 2022. 

At the end of June 2022, eight candidates running for the leadership of the party have officially filled their candidacies. On 1 July 2022, it was announced that Allen Coliban lost the internal elections for being the contender of Cătălin Drulă for the leadership of the party. Subsequently, Cătălin Drulă was elected USR president with 71% of the total votes cast. Among others, Drulă most notably stated that USR's objective is to become the main force in a governing coalition after the 2024 Romanian legislative election and that it will return to government with the PNL only if the party will have the Prime Minister position. Drulă announced in November 2022 that the party has plans to expand in Moldova with Lilian Carp becoming the head of the Moldovan branch.

2020 USR-PLUS Alliance 

Dan Barna (USR) and Dacian Cioloș (PLUS), as leaders of the 2020 USR-PLUS Alliance, declared on 2 February 2019 that the two parties reached an agreement to participate jointly in European elections and that the project was a first step towards a possible success in the 2020 Romanian legislative election.

On 7 March 2019, the Central Electoral Bureau (BEC) rejected the application for registration of the 2020 USR-PLUS Alliance for the European Parliament elections, motivating that Barna and Cioloș were not listed as presidents of the two parties in the Register of Political Parties. Barna was elected president of the USR in October 2017, and Cioloș was elected president of the PLUS in February 2019. Both requested their registration as presidents at the Bucharest Tribunal, but until the Alliance's registration they did not receive a final decision. Deputy Nicușor Dan, former president of the USR, declared that "I found, together with the legal team, the solution that would allow me to legally countersign the protocol of the USR-PLUS Alliance". On March 8, the High Court of Cassation and Justice accepted USR-PLUS' appeal to the decision of the BEC to not to allow the alliance to be registered. The alliance's chosen slogan used to be Fără hoție ajungem departe, meaning "Without thievery we go far" and referring to the existing corruption in Romania. Nowadays, the slogan is O Românie fără hoție ("A Romania without thievery").

On 15 August 2020, members of the USR and PLUS held an online congress to decide whether to formally unite the two parties or not, with 84.65% of the participants voting in favor of a merger. This new party would still be called USR (Save Romania Union) and would be led by Barna and Cioloș until a judicial decision on the merger was made; then, the party would be renamed to "USR PLUS".

The parties, USR and PLUS, officially and legally merged into one single party on 16 April 2021 after the approval of this by the Court of Appeal of Bucharest. In addition, the party was said to be preparing for a new congress, probably held in the autumn of 2021, to vote a single leadership, with Barna and Cioloș announcing that they would both participate in this vote.

In early October 2021, Dacian Cioloș was elected president of the party in the congress. Subsequently, the 24 members of the National Political Bureau were elected and the name of the political party changed back to Save Romania Union (USR), consequently dropping "USR PLUS" as a name.

Political programme 

On 5 October 2016, the Save Romania Union (USR) had officially launched its political programme, with nine chapters on the following areas: transparency, industry, agriculture, education, culture, health, infrastructure, environmental protection, and foreign policy. 

USR militates for maximum transparency, industrialization with modern means, support for small farmers, education reform, a new paradigm in the cultural field, granting 6% of GDP for Health, construction of highways and infrastructure in collaboration with European partners, environmental protection in particular by stopping deforestation as well as close cooperation with the European Union (EU), NATO, and support for accession in these international organizations for neighbouring Republic of Moldova and Ukraine. The president of the USR, Nicușor Dan, said that the program is still in public debate, and could be improved in the nearest future, according to the society's suggestions and recommendations.

In October 2016, the USR declared the public support for then Prime Minister Dacian Cioloș for a new mandate, following the December's parliamentary elections. On 26 October 2016, the Save Romania Union (USR) has announced several candidates for the parliamentary elections in 2016. Mihai Goțiu, journalist and civic activist, writer Dan Lungu, former ministers from Cioloș Vlad Vladrescu's cabinet  and Cristian Ghinea, with former state secretaries of the cabinet have joined the project.

Ideology and issues
The party has been described as one "whose chief identity marker is not a clear program or ideology, but the profile of its candidates." It has also been referred to as a bringing together of "neoliberals, environmentalists, left-liberals, genuine social democrats, Christian Democrats, NGO supporters and minority rights activists". Another source labelled the party as "a diverse group of activists, academics and people from business and the arts, which grew out of a Save Bucharest movement to protect the city’s historic buildings." Its politics have been labelled by some as syncretic.

Dan Barna, the president of USR, characterized the party as "generally centre-right", leaning centre-right on economic policy and centrist in terms of social policy. However, USR has a substantial amount of both progressive and conservative members. He compared the party with Emmanuel Macron's La République En Marche!, while mentioning that the key difference between the two is that USR predominantly consists of people who have not been involved in politics before.

Anti-corruption campaign 

Since its foundation USR has supported the anti-corruption drive in Romania and the activity of the National Anticorruption Directorate. USR was against the modifications to the justice laws initiated by the government coalition PSD-ALDE and requested the rejection of OUG 13 (see also the 2017–2019 Romanian protests).

In 2018, USR helped and supported the initiators of Fără Penali în Funcții Publice ("No Convicts in Public Office") civic campaign, whose objective is to bar the persons convicted to final imprisonment sentences for intentional offences from being elected to local government, the Chamber of Deputies, the Senate, or the office of President of Romania by amending the Article 37 of the Romanian Constitution (which regulates the nomination rules). USR and volunteers collected more than 1million signatures from eligible voters.

Republic of Moldova 
USR supports the Party of Action and Solidarity (PAS) led by Maia Sandu and supports the European path of Moldova. At the June 2018 elections for the Chișinău mayoralty, USR supported the candidate of the pro-European forces, more specifically Andrei Năstase.  Subsequently, with the invalidation of the mandate by Judge Rodica Berdilo, Dan Barna stated:

LGBT rights 
USR's position on LGBT issues is not clearly defined. The ex-party leader, Dan Barna, declared: "Gay marriage is not yet a subject for the public agenda, there is no initiative promoting same-sex marriage. Maybe in 20, 30 years next generations will take care of this problem, but for now, this is not a priority."

However, USR was the only parliamentary party in Romania that did not support the constitutional referendum, proposed by Coaliția pentru Familie (CpF) and supported by the Romanian Orthodox Church. The constitutional amendment proposed to change the definition of family in order to prohibit the same-sex marriage, however it failed, as the turnout was only 21.1%, below the required voter turnout threshold of 30%. USR considered the referendum a way to divide the Romanian people and to distract the attention from the real issues Romania currently faces, such as corruption.

Roșia Montană 
USR supported the inclusion of the Roşia Montană site in UNESCO World Heritage. At the 42nd session of the UNESCO World Heritage Committee, held in Manama, Bahrain, the government's representative, Ștefan Răzvan Rab, state secretary of the Ministry of Culture, in Bahrain, on June 24 to July 4, asked for postponement on behalf of Romania including the Roșia Montană Mining Cultural Landscape in the World Heritage List until the completion of the judicial dispute with Gabriel Resources, an unprecedented fact in the history of UNESCO. USR Senator Vlad Alexandrescu, under whose Ministry of Culture 2015–2016 Roșia Montană was included in the UNESCO indicative list, accused the PSD-ALDE government coalition of treason, writing in a post on 2 July 2018 on Facebook:

European affiliation 

USR supports Romania's membership of the European Union (EU) and is in favor of a joint European external policy and military and of Romania's accession to the Schengen Area. While not being part of any European political party during its first 3 years of existence, USR has had negotiations with Alliance of Liberals and Democrats for Europe Party (ALDE) and to a lesser extent with the European People's Party (EPP) and the European Greens (EGP). USR's hesitation to join ALDE was due to the fact that a Romanian party they vehemently opposed at that time (which was part of a tremendously toxic governmental coalition with the PSD), more specifically the Alliance of Liberals and Democrats (ALDE), was already part of that European party and had the same acronym.

In May 2019, the party stated that it would take part in the new liberal group in the European Parliament that includes France's La République En Marche!, named Renew Europe in June 2019. On 30 May 2019, the Alliance of Liberals and Democrats withdrew from ALDE. Therefore, with no more obstacles on its way, USR joined ALDE on 28 June 2019.

Notable members

Current members 

 Dan Barna - former presidential candidate in 2019, former Deputy Prime Minister, and former party president;
 Cătălin Drulă - former Minister of Transport and current acting/ad interim party president;
 Vlad Voiculescu - former Minister of Health and current party vice-president;
 Clotilde Armand - former MEP and current mayor of Sector 1;
 Dominic Fritz - current mayor of Timișoara;
 Allen Coliban - current mayor of Brașov;
 Claudiu Năsui - former Minister of Economy, Entrepreneurship and Tourism;
 Cristian Ghinea - former MEP and Minister of European Funds;
 Vlad Botoș - current MEP;
 Radu Panait - digital entrepreneur and deputy;
 Vlad Gheorghe - current MEP.

Former members 

 Nicușor Dan - former party president (first party president) and founder as well as current Mayor of Bucharest (since 2020 onwards, after the latest Romanian local elections);
 Dacian Cioloș - former Prime Minister and former party president;
 Ramona Strugariu - MEP;
 Dragoș Pîslaru - MEP;
 Alin Mituța - MEP;
 Dragoș Tudorache - MEP;
 Nicolae Ștefănuță - current MEP;
 Adrian Dohotaru - former deputy, civic activist;
 Ioana Mihăilă - former Minister of Health in the Cîțu cabinet;
 Andrei Lupu - former deputy.

Party leaders

Electoral history

Legislative elections

Local elections

National results

County results

Major cities

Mayor of Bucharest 

 Notes
1

Presidential elections 

Notes:

1 Dan Barna was the candidate endorsed by the 2020 USR-PLUS Alliance.

European elections 

Notes:

1 2020 USR-PLUS Alliance members: USR and PLUS (4 MEPs each).

References

External links
Official website
Official Facebook page
New party attempts to break into Romania’s closed political shop - http://www.intellinews.com/
Dan Barna: Save Romania Union similar to Macron’s En Marche, Euractiv.com –  21 February 2018

2016 establishments in Romania
Political parties established in 2016
Centrist parties in Romania
Liberal parties in Romania
Pro-European political parties in Romania
Registered political parties in Romania